Presidential elections were held in Transvaal in 1872. The result was a victory for Thomas François Burgers, who defeated the "Afrikanerised" Englishman William Robinson, who had been supported by Paul Kruger. Burgers was sworn in as President on 27 June.

Results

References

Elections in Transvaal
Transvaal
1872 in the South African Republic
1870s in Transvaal